The Merchandise Marks Act 1887 (50 & 51 Vict. c. 28) was an Act of the Parliament of the United Kingdom.

The Act stopped foreign manufacturers from falsely claiming that their goods were British-made and selling them in Britain and Europe on that pretence. It also makes it illegal for companies to falsely claim that they have a Royal Warrant.

Swiss watch cases imported to Britain before this date were of 875 millesimal fineness standard. This did not meet the 925 standard for sterling silver and so could not be hallmarked, as the new Act required. The Swiss thus increased the fineness of their silver alloy. However they chose an alloy of 935, in excess of the sterling grade. This has sometimes been claimed to have arisen as a Swiss misunderstanding of the standard required for British Sterling. Such cases were marked in Switzerland with three Swiss bears. This persisted until 1907, when a requirement for hallmarking to be done in Britain, after which the Swiss changed to a 925 alloy.

See also
 Made in Germany

Notes

References

United Kingdom Acts of Parliament 1887